Since the  transfer of sovereignty in 1997, "March of the Volunteers", the national anthem of the People's Republic of China has been adopted for use in an official capacity as the representative national anthem. It is protected by statute under the  National Anthem Ordinance since 12 June 2020 and broadcast regularly on radio or television stations including TVB, RTHK, ViuTV and HOY TV before the Main News or Morning News programs. 

Starting from British rule in 1841 and throughout its modern history, Hong Kong has never had its own official national anthem nor regional anthem. Instead, the national anthem of its mother country is adopted for use in an official capacity, and played at occasions such as major sporting events or ceremonies. 

Colloquially, however, a number of popular anthems have been adopted by segments of the population as representative anthems, and are listed under the "unofficial national anthems" section below.

Historic national anthems 
"Kimigayo", the national anthem of the Empire of Japan during its military occupation of Hong Kong between

Unofficial national anthems 
 "Below the Lion Rock", a Cantopop song by Roman Tam, adopted as a representative anthem during the 2003 SARS outbreak
 "Boundless Oceans, Vast Skies", a song by rock band Beyond, adopted as a representative anthem during the 2014 Hong Kong protests
 "Glory to Hong Kong", a protest song by Thomas dgx yhl and public netizens on LIHKG, is dubbed by some as the national anthem of Hong Kong since the 2019–2020 Hong Kong protests. It was listed as the top search result when searching for the "national anthem of Hong Kong" on search engines such as Google in 2022. Some Hongkongers and supporters of Hong Kong independence and Democratic movement in Hong Kong deem "Glory to Hong Kong" as the anthem that reflects their real identity.

References

See also 
 Hong Kong Flag
 Coat of Arms of Hong Kong

Hong Kong songs